Denisov (masculine) or Denisova (feminine) is a Russian last name, which is derived from the male given name Denis and literally means Denis's. It is shared by the following people:

Viktor Deni (1893–1946), born Viktor Denisov, Soviet satirist
Aleksandr Denisov (b. 1989), Russian footballer
Aleksandr Nikolayevich Denisov (1955-2020), Soviet and Russian military officer
Andrei Denisov (weightlifter) (b. 1963), Israeli Olympic weightlifter
Andrey Denisov (b. 1952), Russian politician
Daria Denisova (b. 1989), Ukrainian artist
Denis Denisov (b. 1981), Russian ice hockey player
Edison Denisov (1929–1996), Soviet composer
Elena Denisova (b. 1963), Austrian violinist
Fedor Denisov, Imperial Russian general, suppressor of the Kościuszko Uprising
Gennadi Denisov (b. 1960), Uzbekistan footballer, father of Vitaliy
Igor Denisov (b. 1984), Russian footballer
Kirill Denisov (b. 1988), Russian judoka
Lyubov Denisova (b. 1971), Russian marathoner
Lyudmyla Denisova (b. 1960), Ukrainian politician
Nikita Denisov (b. 1986), Russian footballer
Nikolai Denisov (1891–1959), Russian footballer
Roman Denisov (footballer, born 1986), Russian football player
Roman Denisov (footballer, born 1999), Russian football player
Sergei Denisov (hockey player)
Sergei Denisov (aviator)
Vasily Orlov-Denisov (1775–1843), Cossack Russian general
Viktor Denisov (b. 1966), Russian canoer
Vitaliy Denisov (b. 1987), Uzbekistan footballer, son of Gennadi
Vitaly Denisov (b. 1976), Russian cross country skier
Vladimir Denisov (ice hockey) (b. 1984), Belarusian ice hockey player
Vladimir Denisov (fencer)  (b. 1947), Russian Olympic fencer
Vyacheslav Denisov (b. 1983), Uzbekistan basketball player

Other
 Denisov family
Denisova Cave, an archeological site in Siberia.
 Denisovan, the ancient hominin discovered in Denisova Cave
Denisov District of northern Kazakhstan

Russian-language surnames
Patronymic surnames
Surnames from given names